Santo Domingo, Oaxaca may refer to:

Santo Domingo Albarradas
Santo Domingo Armenta
Santo Domingo Chihuitán
Santo Domingo de Morelos
Santo Domingo del Estado
Santo Domingo Ingenio
Santo Domingo Ixcatlán
Santo Domingo Nuxaá
Santo Domingo Ozolotepec
Santo Domingo Petapa
Santo Domingo Roayaga
Santo Domingo Tehuantepec
Santo Domingo Teojomulco
Santo Domingo Tepuxtepec
Santo Domingo Tlatayapam
Santo Domingo Tomaltepec
Santo Domingo Tonalá
Santo Domingo Tonaltepec
Santo Domingo Xagacia
Santo Domingo Yanhuitlán
Santo Domingo Yodohino
Santo Domingo Zanatepec

See also
Church of Santo Domingo de Guzmán (Oaxaca)
Santo Domingo (disambiguation)